The New Orleans Academy of Fine Arts is a fine arts school in New Orleans, Louisiana.

Overview 
The New Orleans Academy of Fine Arts was founded in 1978 by Auseklis Ozols, inspired by the model of Thomas Eakins and the Pennsylvania Academy of Fine Arts. The goal was to gather artists and aspiring artists together and teach Classical techniques, stressing working from life. Ozols was joined at the academy's inception by Dell Weller. Artist and philanthropist Dorothy J. Coleman helped establish the academy as a stable institution, and it was incorporated as a non-profit institution in 1980.

"The ancient disciplines of painting, sculpture and drawing have always attracted unique people with an intense awareness of their sensations through non-verbal media. The ancient academies were collections of such people who sought others like themselves, along with a place to share their ideas. Artists working in guilds or academies have accumulated a vast wealth of information, technical as well as aesthetic, over the centuries. Artists learned from their master and in turn, pass their knowledge to future generations. The New Orleans Academy of Fine Arts strives to continue this legacy by providing the facilities for serious study of the fine arts.

Of paramount importance is the study of the human form in all its attributes and applications of the fine arts. Portraiture, landscape, sculpture and their corresponding technical disciplines are included in the course of study. The Academy believes that a reinvestigation of traditional aesthetic values forms the strongest foundation for eventual creative expression and stylistic development."

The academy, located at 5256 Magazine Street in New Orleans, has teaching facilities, a gallery (locally known as the "academy gallery") and a framing shop, on Magazine Street in Uptown New Orleans. The main academy building is oriented to the compass points, enabling the painting studios to have exact north light year round.

The academy's teaching year is broken up into fall, spring and summer terms, with the summer term being shorter. Each term, there is typically instruction on:
Beginning and intermediate drawing
Beginning, intermediate and advanced still life painting
Portrait drawing
Portrait painting
Life drawing
Life painting
Landscape painting
Figure sculpture
Portrait sculpture
Color and design
Art history
Watercolor painting
Abstract acrylic painting
Gouache painting

There are also life studio sessions, in which anyone may use whatever medium they prefer to draw, paint, or sculpt from a live model.

External links

 NOAFA.com website

References

Educational institutions established in 1978
Culture of New Orleans
Art schools in Louisiana
Schools in New Orleans
Buildings and structures in New Orleans
Tourist attractions in New Orleans
Art museums and galleries in Louisiana
1978 in art
1978 establishments in Louisiana
Private universities and colleges in Louisiana